Count John VII ‘the Middle’ of Nassau-Siegen (7 June 1561 – 27 September 1623), official titles: Graf zu Nassau, Katzenelnbogen, Vianden und Diez, Herr zu Beilstein, was since 1606 Count of Nassau-Siegen, a part of the County of Nassau, and the progenitor of the House of Nassau-Siegen, a cadet branch of the Ottonian Line of the House of Nassau. He was one of the most important military theorists of his time, who introduced many innovations and inventions. His Kriegsbuch contained all the military knowledge of his time, but also many new ideas, which made an essential contribution to the reform of the Dutch States Army by his cousin Maurice. John served in the Dutch States Army, was colonel general of the Palatinate and commander-in-chief of the Swedish army. His reputation reached far beyond the borders of the Holy Roman Empire.

Biography

John first attended the Counts’ School in Siegen and then – in 1576 – went to the Heidelberg University together with his three oldest brothers William Louis, George and Philip and his cousin Maurice of Nassau, but left the university the following year at his father’s request. He did not regret his departure at all, because he found ‘das Studieren nicht anmutig’ (‘studying not graceful’). John got involved early in the administration, finances and military affairs of his father’s county.

John ‘the Elder’ had plans to reorganise the finances of the county of Nassau-Siegen through a rich marriage of his son, but when John ‘the Middle’ declared that he had already given his heart, the father did not make the slightest attempt to let political reason prevail over the son’s wish. This speaks for the characters of father and son, who always got along very well and complemented each other in the best way. By his marriage in 1581 to Countess Magdalene of Waldeck-Wildungen (like his grandmother Countess Juliane of Stolberg-Wernigerode, widow of a count of Hanau-Münzenberg), John ‘the Middle’ strengthened the relations within the Wetterauer Grafenverein and thus contributed – even without a substantial financial contribution – to the strengthening of the House of Nassau.

Military career

Contributing to his father’s military reform
John experienced his first military campaign under Count Palatine John Casimir in 1583, for which troops were assembled in the area of Siegen. At that time, John became acquainted with the practice of mercenary armies, whose disadvantages his father had described in numerous conversations.

From 1584 onwards, John was engaged in reinforcing the fortifications of Nassau Castle and Dillenburg Castle. During the military reform of John ‘the Elder’, especially his introduction of general conscription, John ‘the Middle’ ensured better training. Realising that conscripted subjects should not be led helplessly to the slaughter, he ensured that the men were properly trained. He ordered standardised rifles of the same caliber for them, so that one could help the other with bullets. And he created uniform clothing, clearly aware that the men would feel like soldiers in that uniform. Uniforms and standardised armaments were something entirely new for that time. The Siegerländer Landesausschluß wore a brown hat with a feather and a blue lining, a yellow leather or linen gambeson, a red overcoat with a blue lining and a white collar. Trousers and socks were blue. This uniform corresponded with the costume which had already been acquired in 1481/82 in the Netherlands for the men of the Siegen marksmen’s guild.

For weapons training, John invented the foot drill. The men were favourably inclined towards this measure, because they saw for themselves how they could gain a huge amount of time by continuous practice in handling weapons and thus had a great advantage over their opponents. In Nassau, and especially in the Siegerland where it was introduced first, there was never any protest against the general conscription, because the population considered the Counts’ struggle for the freedom of the Netherlands as their own. They shared with the territorial lord the biblically founded conviction of the right of this Dutch Revolt against the rape of body and soul.

In the Dutch States Army

Relatively late, in 1592, John entered the Dutch Revolt. There he participated in the sieges of Steenwijk and Coevorden. With Prince Maurice, he was more like a brother than as a cousin, because they had spent their youth together in Dillenburg and Siegen. When John showed him and his brother William Louis his notes containing his thoughts on military training, it was ‘nun wol im anfang ein solches veracht und für Superfluum gehalten’ (‘despised in the beginning and thought to be superfluous’). But soon Maurice had to realise that the Ausschußmänner from the county of Nassau-Siegen and the equally educated peasants from the Westerwald were better than the Dutch soldiers. Immediately, John’s approach was introduced into all garrisons of the United Provinces. A new type of mortar invented by John, together with the corresponding incendiary bullets, both of which he had made cast in Siegen, was tested at the Siege of Groenlo in 1597 and had a devastating effect.

Military theorist
John put his thoughts on paper when they occurred to him: under the titles Observationes, Landesrettungswerk, Memorial, Discours, etc. Together they form a Kriegsbuch that reflects all military knowledge of the time, but above all contains a wealth of completely new ideas, from the art of large fortifications to the most advantageous arrangement of a ‘secret chamber’. John's military writings laid the foundation for the supremacy of the Dutch States Army and thus constituted an essential contribution to the victory. They were republished in 1973. John was one of the most important military theorists of his time and his reputation reached far beyond the borders of the Holy Roman Empire.

Commander-in-Chief of the Swedish Army
In the great theatre of operations of the Counter-Reformation, King Sigismund III, the Catholic Vasa, had united Poland and Sweden in his hand. His uncle, the Calvinist Duke Charles of Södermanland led the opposition to Sigismund. John thought it was a matter for Protestants to support Charles. Therefore, with the consent of the Wetterauer Grafenverein, he travelled to the battlefield in Livonia. However, he first visited his brother William Louis in Friesland, and only when the latter also approved of the plan and John knew that Nassau was in the care of his brother, did he go to Charles, whom he met in Pernau on 16 July 1601. Charles immediately offered John the supreme command, which he accepted ‘trotz der geringen Lusten’ (‘despite the low desire’), but only for a period of three months, because the Swedish army was in a more than poor condition. The foot soldiers, for instance, were so miserably armed that John devised and immediately ordered the production of spiked carts, which were pushed in front of the infantry and proved to be a great protection against the attacking cavalry. Such spiked carts were kept in the arsenal of Siegen for decades.

After three months, during which John had won several skirmishes and captured much material from the Poles, but had not been able to bring the Siege of Riga to a successful conclusion, Charles begged him to stay in Livonia and remain in command. John accepted his plea. Immediately afterwards, the cold became so fierce that within six weeks 40,000 people either froze or starved to death, including 4,500 of the 6,000 foot soldiers from Nassau. And again, after three months, John was persuaded to stay. Then, however, first the thaw set in and then a mutiny put an end to all military operations. John wrote in vain to get money to pay the troops. He had long since pawned his collars and jewellery for the troops’ wages. Finally, he really resigned from his duties. Charles provided a Swedish naval ship for the journey to Lübeck, which had to remain on Bornholm for a long time due to violent storms. John’s wages of 18,000 guilders had still not been paid by the Swedes 29 years later.

And yet the arduous northern journey had brought John something good. He met the youngest daughter of Duke John of Schleswig-Holstein-Sonderburg (a brother of the Danish king) and married her in 1603, although he already had a son a year older than this Margaret of Schleswig-Holstein-Sonderburg. John’s first wife had died in 1599.

In the service of the Palatinate
In 1599, Elector Palatine Frederick IV offered John the post of colonel general to reorganise the country’s defences. In 1610 John was commander of the Palatine Union troops.

When the Upper Palatinate (where his mother came from) was threatened, the fact that John was ready with thirteen companies of cavalry and six companies of footsoldiers on the Neidenau Heath was enough to keep the enemy, the Passau-Leopoldine folk, from attacking. After this brief appearance in the Upper Palatinate, the city of Nuremberg prepared a welcome for him ‘wie sonst nicht leichthin geschieht und nur Wenigen widerfährt’ (‘as otherwise does not happen lightly and happens to only a few’).

In 1621 he organised the defence of the Palatinate against the Spaniards under Spinola. However, the Spanish pressure on Nassau forced him to retreat prematurely and thus ruined his life's work.

Advocate of Protestant Unity
John was a champion of Protestant political unity against the forces of the Counter-Reformation. However, he rarely achieved greater political influence. Therefore he lacked the necessary perseverance, despite high intelligence, diligence and agility. The extent of John’s ambitious political plans and the power of a Protestant Union, as he imagined it, is best shown by the fact that in 1598 he seriously wanted to promote the idea of electing his cousin Maurice of Nassau as German king.

One of the leading Protestant figures of that time was Fürst Christian I of Anhalt-Bernburg, who, like John, aspired to a great Protestant alliance against the Habsburgs. But Emperor Rudolf II tried to lure Christian with promises. The fact that Christian did not succumb to this, but remained in the Protestant camp, was regarded by both as John’s merit. Christian and John became good friends. Their common goal was to win over Elector Joachim Frederick of Brandenburg to the Protestant cause, and to this end they wanted to help him acquire the disputed duchy of Jülich-Cleves-Berg. Landgrave Maurice of Hesse-Kassel joined them, and in 1603 the latter married Juliane, the 16-year-old daughter of John.

On 25 March 1609, Duke John William of Jülich-Cleves-Berg died childless. His inheritance was claimed by Palatine Neuburg, Brandenburg, Saxony and Palatine Zweibrücken. The first two candidates were Protestants, the other two Catholics. John, who always wanted the unity of the Protestant camp, wanted to avoid a war between Brandenburg and Palatine Neuburg at all costs, and during preparatory negotiations in Siegen and on 10 June 1609 in Dortmund, he managed to get Count Palatine Wolfgang William of Neuburg and Elector John Sigismund of Brandenburg to agree on a common approach. Both asked John to take over the supreme command of their troops, in case the inheritance dispute could not be solved without force of arms. The Landesrettungsverein of the Wetterau appointed him colonel, because all trained young nobles were in foreign service. As a mediator, John successfully continued the example set by his grandfather William ‘the Rich’.

In September 1610, as an envoy of the Protestant Imperial Estates of the realm, John negotiated with the leader of the Catholic League, Duke Maximilian I of Bavaria, where they reached a mutually satisfactory agreement. In 1615, he mediated an agreement between the city Brunswick and Duke Frederick Ulrich of Brunswick-Wolfenbüttel.

When the young Elector Palatine Frederick V was urged by the Protestant Imperial Estates to accept the Bohemian crown, he did so after extensive consultation with John and Christian I of Anhalt-Bernburg. And while Frederick went to Bohemia to rule that one winter (for which he was later called ‘the Winter King’), John prepared the Palatinate for defence. He was also commissioned to draw up plans to strengthen the Rhine from Bonn to Rheinberg, to modernise the fortress of Düsseldorf and to design a system of fortifications for the Ruhr, Ems and Lippe rivers. He had to prepare the national defence for Berg, Mark and Cleves, after he had refused the post of Field Marshal in Jülich.

Count of Nassau-Siegen

When his father died on 8 October 1606, John succeeded his father together with his brothers William Louis, George, Ernest Casimir and John Louis. On 30 March 1607 the brothers divided their possessions. John acquired Siegen, Freudenberg, Netphen, Hilchenbach,  and the Haingericht. The brothers then also signed a succession treaty. By this agreement the heirs of the brothers were explicitly forbidden to convert to a religion other than the Reformed confession. Since the partition, John has had his Residenz in Siegen Castle, which he had renovated around that time.

The sons of his first marriage caused John much and great concern. Both John Ernest and Adolf in The Hague and John ‘the Younger’ in Kassel had the reputation of being gamblers and of showing a completely unseemly splendour in their clothes and appearance. John wrote letters to these young counts, full of fatherly admonitions, exhorting them to be thrifty, because he did not know what to do with his worries and debts. In a letter of 8 December 1608 he even considered the death of his son Adolf as a punishment from God and he exhorted the two others, who with ‘einem ärgerlichen Leben mit Verschwendung fast allem, was ich in der Welt habe, durch Ehebrechen und Hurerei, Plünderung und Beraubung armer, unschuldiger Leute hoch und niederen Standen’ (‘an annoying life of squandering almost everything I have in the world, through adultery and fornication, plundering and robbing poor, innocent people of high and low rank’) ruined the county of Nassau-Siegen, to lead a different, better life, worthy of the name Nassau.

In 1610 John took part in the Princes’ Day in Schwäbisch Hall as the representative of the entire House of Nassau and the Wetterauer Grafenverein. In 1612 he travelled to Frankfurt, with his brother George and his two sons John Ernest and John ‘the Younger’, for the coronation of Roman King Matthias, whom he congratulated as spokesman of the House of Nassau and many other counts. It was up to him to be the first to cut off a piece of the roast beef in front of the Römer and bring it to the royal table.

With his brothers he signed new succession treaties in 1611 and 1613. Noteworthy is the House Treaty with his brother George in 1618 about his not claiming the part of the county of Nassau-Dillenburg that was rightfully his. In 1619 he also signed a treaty with his brothers about the advances that had previously been paid to William the Silent. Finally, the brothers signed a treaty on the division of the lands that had become vacant after the death of William Louis of Nassau-Dillenburg and the debts attached to them.

After the outbreak of hostilities in the Thirty Years’ War, he initially remained faithful to his old, long-standing connection with the Palatinate, and stayed behind as commander-in-chief of the troops stationed in the Palatinate. In this way, on the approach of the imperial troops and those of the Catholic League, he placed his own country in great danger. Yet it took the most urgent appeals of his brothers to persuade him at last to abandon his friend’s cause and return to Siegen, where he, martial and capable as he was, diligently devoted himself to all preparations for the protection of town and country.

Foundation of the Kriegsschule
John’s idea to give the Protestant cause good leaders for a people’s army, was the reason for the Kriegsschule, founded in Siegen in 1616, probably the world’s first military academy. The princes John asked for financial support, did not give him a penny. But despite the fact that he was so indebted by supporting the Dutch Revolt, that for some time he considered giving up his residence in Siegen and going to live with his brother William Louis, he nevertheless founded the school. At that time his wife Margaret wrote a letter to King Christian IV of Denmark, asking for the payment of an old debt. Possibly Danish money served to open the Kriegsschule. However, the Thirty Years’ War broke out so early that the Kriegsschule in Siegen could not be effective and soon ceased to exist.

A strange twist of fate, however, made it possible for two of John’s descendants to complete abroad what he was not able to complete. Count William of Schaumburg-Lippe founded the famous Portuguese War and Artillery Academy and in Schaumburg-Lippe the Academy for artillery and military engineering (whose most famous pupil was Gerhard von Scharnhorst). The other descendant of John was Friedrich Wilhelm von Steuben, the organiser of the Continental Army and an important aide to George Washington.

Settlement of the succession by wills of 1607, 1618 and 1621

When John received the County of Nassau-Siegen in 1607, he decided that such a small country (it had about 9,000 inhabitants and yielded an annual revenue of about 13,000 guilders) should not be divided up again. In order to avoid this, he made a will and testament, which stated that only the eldest son would rule and the other children should be compensated with money or offices. As one of the most convinced advocates of Protestantism, it was particularly painful for John that his second son, John ‘the Younger’, converted to the Catholic Church in 1613. This act of his son overshadowed the last years of John’s life and caused him great anxiety. In a codicil of 8 October 1613 he explicitly stipulated that his heirs had to keep the land in the Reformed confession. At first, the conversion of John ‘the Younger’ to Catholicism did not change this house law established by the will, because he was not the eldest son. That was John Ernest.

To the great surprise of his relatives, John ‘the Younger’ joined the Spaniards in 1617 and thus joined the opponents of the House of Nassau and the Dutch Republic. In the same year, his older brother John Ernest died in the service of the Republic of Venice. The transition of John ‘the Younger’ to the political enemy hit his father as hard as the conversion to Catholicism had hit him. This new situation forced John to ask himself whether an enemy of Nassau and the Netherlands could remain his heir at all. On 15 November 1617, John declared his will of 8 April 1607 to be null and void. Abolition of the primogeniture would have meant a division of the small country, and therefore John opposed all proposals in that direction. Instead, in an amicable agreement, he had his son sign a declaration on 31 December 1617, in which the latter declared that, although he himself was and remained a Catholic, he would not force his subjects to any other than the existing religious confession. All his brothers advised John ‘the Middle’ to change the primogeniture, but he firmly trusted the word, the letter and the seal of his son, whom he loved in spite of everything, as the latter loved and respected his father. It grieved them both that they had to hurt each other because of the difference in their beliefs. On 22 December 1618 John drew up a second will, which had the above-mentioned promises of his son as a condition and still held on to the primogeniture. However, he imposed the penalty of disinheritance on the introduction of ‘papism’. He explicitly assumed that the Dutch branch of the House of Nassau would come to his aid, just as his father had come to William the Silent’s aid. He therefore repeatedly turned to his cousin Maurice of Orange to obtain from him an assurance of assistance in the event that his son would not keep his word and would use force in Siegerland with the help of Spanish or imperial troops. But Maurice and the States General showed no interest at all in what was happening in the little County of Nassau-Siegen. This was a bitter disappointment to John, although, on the other hand, he realised that the Netherlands could not intervene everywhere and had enough problems of its own. For a while, he even considered placing a Dutch garrison in Siegen.

Why John ‘the Middle’ still distrusted his son, in spite of the latter’s confirmations, cannot be fully elucidated. Maybe it was because John ‘the Younger’ loudly proclaimed everywhere that no power in the world could prevent him from succeeding in Nassau-Siegen, because the power of the Emperor and the King of Spain was behind him. Perhaps John ‘the Middle’ also knew the influence of the de Ligne family and the Catholic clergy on his son. It is certain that such rumours were conveyed to him from all sides, and that his relatives and other Protestant Imperial Estates warned him again and again about his son. Only once he was convinced that his son was under the influence of the Jesuits and that the possibility of a Catholic area within the Nassau lands was a danger to the Protestant inhabitants, did he get persuaded to make a new will. On 3 July 1621 he drew up a third will, in which he laid down something that he had always considered to be utterly nonsensical, namely to divide the small county of Nassau-Siegen, which was barely able to support one lord, into three parts. It was an act of pure desperation. His three eldest sons, John ‘the Younger’, William and John Maurice, were to receive one third each. The administration of the city of Siegen would remain in joint ownership of the three sons.

For John ‘the Younger’, therefore, only one third of the county was provided for in the third will. On 6 August 1621, he was informed of this, with a precise statement of the reasons that had led his father to take this step. On 9 May 1623, i.e. not until two years later, John ‘the Younger’ protested against this with a letter from Frankfurt to the councillors of Siegen. Of course, in the meantime he had not been idle and had not hesitated to denounce his father to the Emperor. At the time of his letter of protest he was certainly already aware of the Poenale mandatum cassatorium, which Emperor Ferdinand II officially issued some time later, on 27 June 1623, informing John ‘the Middle’ that at the time of making his third will as a fellow combatant of the outlawed Winter King he was not entitled to make a will. He had to revoke it and answer to an imperial court within two months. It seems that John ‘the Younger’ then shrank from having the imperial decree delivered to his seriously ill father.

Death, burial and reburial
John ‘the Middle’ died at Siegen Castle on 27 September 1623. None of the three sons mentioned in the will were present at the death of their father. On 13 October William and John Maurice arrived in Siegen, and on 26 October John ‘the Younger’.

For this, there are remarkable notes in Latin, partly in elegiac couplets, for a projected memorial and burial place of the sovereign family, from the time around 1620, with the names of all 25 children from his two marriages, also with details of birth, marriage and death of his relatives. Since the project was not carried out, the burials of the members of the sovereign family between 1607 and 1658 took place in the inadequate burial vault under the choir of the mentioned parish church. John ‘the Middle’ was buried on 5/15 November 1623 in the St. Nicholas Church in Siegen. Georgius Remus wrote a Leichenpredigt for him, which was published in Herborn in 1624.

Succession dispute

Everyone knew that there would be a dispute at the reading of the will on 11 December 1623. John ‘the Younger’ had the imperial decree read out, and when his brothers were not very impressed by it, he said as he stood up: ‘Der Kaiser wird uns scheiden!’ (‘The Emperor will part us!’). He had taken the precaution of obtaining a further imperial decree on 20 November 1623 against Countess Dowager Margaret and her sons, in which the Emperor strictly forbade impeding John’s assumption of government, his taking possession of the land and his inauguration. On 12 January 1624, John ‘the Younger’ was able to accept the homage from the city of Siegen, but only because he beforehand had secretly let a squadron of selected horsemen into the town through the castle gate (that is, not through a city gate) in a heavy snowstorm, so that they could not be seen or heard by the town guards.

John ‘the Younger’ thus received the entire inheritance, and the provisions of the will made in favour of William and John Maurice remained a dead letter. With the exception of John Maurice and George Frederick, the younger brothers accepted only modest appanages. Henceforth, until 1645, the county of Nassau-Siegen had two governments, one in Siegen, the other in Hilchenbach. However, for a short period (1632–1635) this situation underwent a temporary change: during the Thirty Years’ War, his brothers, who were fighting on the Protestant side, rebelled against John ‘the Younger’.

Count Louis Henry of Nassau-Dillenburg entered the service of King Gustavus II Adolphus of Sweden on 1 December 1631, who had landed in Germany on 24 June 1630 to intervene in favour of the Protestants in the Thirty Years’ War. Countess Dowager Margaret, through the mediation of Louis Henry, turned to Gustavus Adolphus and asked for help against the machinations of her stepson John ‘the Younger’. Consequently, on 14 February 1632 the Swedish king sent an order from Frankfurt to Louis Henry to provide military support for his first cousin John Maurice. Louis Henry then occupied the city of Siegen with his regiment of Dutch and Swedish soldiers. One day later, on 29 February, John Maurice and his brother Henry arrived in Siegen. Just as John ‘the Younger’ had kept his cavalry in reserve eight years earlier, now John Maurice and Henry, supported by the presence of the Swedish regiment, negotiated with the citizens, who felt bound by the oath they had sworn to John ‘the Younger’. On 4 March, after long and difficult negotiations, the citizens paid homage to John Maurice and Henry. John Maurice obtained for himself not only the Freudenberg district, which his father had intended for him in the will of 1621, but also Netphen, which had been intended for John ‘the Younger’ in the same will. William was not only confirmed in the possession of Hilchenbach, but also received Ferndorf and Krombach, as stipulated in his father’s will. The city of Siegen paid homage only to William and John Maurice, who only in 1635 admitted their elder brother John ‘the Younger’ back into co-sovereignty. However, the latter soon restored the old order: in 1636, he again became the sole owner of his father's property, with the exception of Hilchenbach, which he left to William, and he again governed the city of Siegen alone. John Maurice was again excluded from the county’s sovereignty. However, in 1642 he inherited the territory from his brother William in accordance with his father’s will.

John ‘the Younger’ died in Ronse on 27 July 1638. His only son John Francis Desideratus was born in Nozeroy on 28 July 1627. His mother acted as regent until his marriage in 1651. He made several attempts to obtain the whole Siegerland. In 1646 he visited the Emperor in Vienna to protest against his uncle John Maurice’s seizure of the county. On 22 January 1645, after his return from Brazil, the latter, with his brothers George Frederick and Henry and an 80-man entourage, had forcibly occupied Siegen Castle and on 15 February had received the renewed homage from the citizens, albeit this time only for two thirds of the county. In order to end the constant dispute, John Maurice wanted to adhere strictly to his father’s will of 1621 and leave his nephew John Francis Desideratus the one third that was due to him. Already before his departure to Brazil, on 25 October 1635, he had explicitly authorised his subjects to recognise the then still living John ‘the Younger’ as co-ruler. In 1645 John Maurice relinquished his rights to the Freudenberg district, granted by the will of 1621, in favour of his brother George Frederick. John Francis Desideratus was unsuccessful with the Emperor in Vienna, and two years later, at the Congress of Westphalia, Emperor Ferdinand III ratified the fiercely contested 1621 will of John ‘the Middle’. This left John Francis Desideratus only the Catholic third part, which is still known today as Johannland. John Maurice held both the other thirds in his hand, because his brother William had already died and left him his third part, and George Frederick had ceded all his rights to John Maurice in 1649. It was therefore the latter who continued to administer the Freudenberg district.

Explanation of the nickname ‘the Middle’
In the time that John ‘the Middle’ lived, it was not yet customary for reigning counts to be numbered, as was the case with kings. When father and son had the same given name and the son came of age, it was necessary to distinguish both. In this case, the father was referred to as Johann ‘der Ältere’ and the son as Johann ‘der Jüngere’. This is similar to the still-used custom that, when father and son bear the same given name and surname, they are distinguished by the addition of the respective abbreviations Sr. (senior) and Jr. (junior) after the surname. That John ‘the Middle’ was originally called ‘the Younger’ is shown in the documents found in the 1990s in the Hessisches Hauptstaatsarchiv in Wiesbaden (HHStA 171 D 1161), in which an attempt was made to record, at least from time to time, who was buried where and when in the burial vault in Dillenburg. In these documents John’s first wife is mentioned as ‘Graf Johan des Jüngern gemahlin frau Magdalena gebohrne von Waldeck’ and his son, who died in 1600, as ‘Graf Johans des Jungern söhnlein Friderich Ludwig’.
But this Johann ‘der Jüngere’ also had a son named John. When this son came of age, the distinction was no longer sufficient, since there were now three men from three successive generations with the same given name. The youngest was now referred to as Johann ‘der Jüngere’, and the middle one was called Johann ‘der Mittlere’. It was not until the nineteenth century that historians started to give the reigning counts a regal number. Johann ‘der Ältere’ became John VI, Johann ‘der Mittlere’ became John VII, and Johann ‘der Jüngere’ became John VIII.

Marriages and issue

First marriage
John ‘the Middle’ married firstly at Dillenburg Castle on 9 December 1581 to Countess Magdalene of Waldeck-Wildungen (1558 – Idstein Castle, 9 September 1599), the youngest daughter of Count Philip IV of Waldeck-Wildungen and his third wife Countess Jutta of Isenburg-Grenzau. Magdalene was the widow of Count Philip Louis I of Hanau-Münzenberg.

From the marriage of John and Magdalene the following children were born:
 John Ernest (Siegen Castle, 21 October 1582Jul. – Udine, 16/17 September 1617Jul.), was, among other things, a general in the Venetian army, involved in the Uskok War.
 Count John VIII ‘the Younger’ (Dillenburg Castle, 29 September 1583Jul. –  near Oudenaarde,– 27 July 1638), succeeded his father as Count of Nassau-Siegen in 1623. Married in Brussels on 13 August 1618 to Princess  (2 November 1594 – Brussels, 4 January 1663).
 Elisabeth (Dillenburg Castle, 8 November 1584 – , 26 July 1661), married in Wildungen in November 1604 to Count Christian of Waldeck-Wildungen (Eisenberg Castle, 24/25 December 1585 – , 31 December 1637).
 Adolf (Dillenburg Castle, 8 August 1586 – Xanten, 7 November 1608), was a captain in the Dutch States Army.
 Juliane (Dillenburg Castle, 3 September 1587 – Eschwege, 15 February 1643), married at Dillenburg Castle on 21 May 1603Jul. (Beilager) and in Kassel on 4 June 1603Jul. (Heimführung) to Landgrave Maurice of Hesse-Kassel (Kassel, 25 May 1572 – Eschwege, 15 March 1632).
 Anne Mary (Dillenburg Castle, 3 March 1589 – 22 February 1620), married in Dillenburg on 3 February 1611Jul. to Count  (ca. 1581 – 13 March 1653), Count of Falkenstein and Broich.
 John Albert (Dillenburg, 8 February 1590 – Dillenburg, 1590).
 Count William (Dillenburg, 13 August 1592 – Orsoy, 7/17 July 1642), was since 1624 count in a part of Nassau-Siegen and since 1633 field marshal of the Dutch States army. Married at Siegen Castle on 17 January 1619 to Countess Christiane of Erbach (5 June 1596 – Culemborg, 6 July 1646).
 Frederick Louis (2 February 1595 – Dillenburg, 22 April 1600Jul.).
 Magdalene (23 February 1596 – 6 December 1662), married:
 in August 1631 to Bernhard Moritz Freiherr von Oeynhausen-Velmede (1602 – Leipzig, 20 November 1632);
 on 25 August 1642  (20 March 1591 – Bremen, 5 May 1652).
 John Frederick (10 februari 1597 – 1597).

Second marriage

John ‘the Middle’ remarried at Rotenburg Castle on 27 August 1603 to Duchess Margaret of Schleswig-Holstein-Sonderburg (Haus Sandberg am Alsensund near Sonderburg, 24 February 1583 – , Siegen, 10/20 April 1658), the youngest daughter of Duke John ‘the Younger’ of Schleswig-Holstein-Sonderburg and his first wife Duchess Elisabeth of Brunswick-Grubenhagen.

From the marriage of John and Margaret the following children were born:
 Fürst John Maurice (Dillenburg Castle, 18 June 1604 – Berg und Tal near Cleves, 10/20 December 1679), was among others captain-admiral-governor-general of Dutch Brazil 1636–1644, stadtholder of Cleves, Mark, Ravensberg and Minden since 1647, Grand Master of the Order of Saint John since 1652 and First Field Marshal of the Dutch States Army 1668–1674. Became count in ⅔ part of the County of Nassau-Siegen in 1645 and was elevated to Reichsfürst in 1652.
 George Frederick Louis (Dillenburg Castle, 23 February 1606 – Bergen op Zoom, 2 October 1674), was among others commander of Rheinberg and governor of Bergen op Zoom. In 1664 he was elevated to the rank and title of prince. Married in The Hague on 4 June 1647 to Mauritia Eleonora of Portugal (baptised Delft, 10 May 1609 – Bergen op Zoom, 15 June 1674).
 William Otto (Dillenburg Castle, 23 June 1607 – near Wolfenbüttel, 14 August 1641), was an officer in the Swedish army.
 Sophie Margaret (Siegen Castle, 16 April 1610 – , Terborg, 8/18 May 1665), married at Wisch Castle in Terborg on 13 January 1656 to George Ernest of Limburg-Stirum (Botmurde, 29 August 1593 – September 1661), Count of Bronckhorst, Lord of Wisch, Lichtenvoorde and Wildenborch.
 Henry (Siegen Castle, 9 August 1611 – Hulst, 27 October/7 November 1652), was among others colonel in the Dutch States Army, governor of Hulst and envoy on behalf of the States-General of the Netherlands. Married at Wisch Castle in Terborg on 19/29 April 1646 to Countess Mary Magdalene of Limburg-Stirum (1632 – Nassauischer Hof, Siegen, 27 December 1707).
 Mary Juliane (Siegen Castle, 14 August 1612 – Neuhaus an der Elbe, 21 January 1665Jul.), married in Treptow on 13 December 1637 to Duke Francis Henry of Saxe-Lauenburg (9 April 1604 – 26 November 1658).
 Amalie (Siegen Castle, 2 September 1613 – Sulzbach, 24 August 1669Greg.), married:
 in Alt-Stettin on 23 April 1636 to Herman Wrangel af Salmis (in Livonia, 29 June 1587 – Riga, 11 December 1643);
 in Stockholm on 27 March 1649 to Count Palatine Christian Augustus of Sulzbach (Sulzbach, 26 July 1622 – Sulzbach, 23 April 1708).
 Bernhard (Siegen Castle, 18 November 1614 – Siegen Castle, 6 January 1617Jul.).
 Christian (Siegen Castle, 16 July 1616 – near Düren, 1/11 April 1644), was a colonel in the Imperial Army. Married ca. 1641 to Anna Barbara von Quadt-Landskron-Rheinbach.
 Catharine (Siegen Castle, 1 August 1617 – Nassauischer Hof, Siegen, 31 August 1645).
 John Ernest (Siegen Castle, 8 November 1618Jul. – São Salvador da Bahia de Todos os Santos, Brazil, 23 November 1639), was a naval officer on board the ‘Alkmaar’.
 Elisabeth Juliane (Siegen Castle, 1 May 1620Jul. – Wesel, 13 May 1665), married in the Nassauischer Hof in Siegen on 9/19 August 1647 to Count Bernhard of Sayn-Wittgenstein-Berleburg-Neumagen (30 November 1620 – , 13 December 1675).

Known descendants
Although the House of Nassau-Siegen became extinct in male lineage in 1743, John ‘the Middle’ has many known descendants in female lineage. Not only all reigning European monarchs are descendants of John, but also the heads of the no longer reigning royal houses of Austria, Baden, Bavaria, Greece, Lippe, Prussia, Romania and Waldeck and Pyrmont. Other known descendants are:
 the Prussian Field Marshal Fürst Leopold I of Anhalt-Dessau (der Alte Dessauer), 
 the French Field Marshal Maurice of Saxony, 
 the Austrian chancellor Klemens von Metternich, 
 the French writer George Sand, 
 the Romanian writer Carmen Sylva, 
 the Norwegian explorer Fridtjof Nansen, 
 the German chancellor Max von Baden, and 
 the German fighter pilot from World War I Manfred von Richthofen (The Red Baron).

Ancestors

Notes

References

Sources
 
 
 
 
  (1911). "George Frederik, Georg Friedrich". In:  en  (redactie), Nieuw Nederlandsch Biografisch Woordenboek (in Dutch). Vol. Eerste deel. Leiden: A.W. Sijthoff. p. 926.
  (1911). "Johan VII". In:  en  (redactie), Nieuw Nederlandsch Biografisch Woordenboek (in Dutch). Vol. Eerste deel. Leiden: A.W. Sijthoff. p. 1221.
  (1911). "Johan (Johann), de Jongere, graaf van Nassau-Siegen". In:  en  (redactie), Nieuw Nederlandsch Biografisch Woordenboek (in Dutch). Vol. Eerste deel. Leiden: A.W. Sijthoff. p. 1221–1222.
 
 
 
 
 
 
 
 
 
 
 
 
 
 
  (1999). "Genealogische tabellen". In:  e.a. (red.), Johan Wolfert van Brederode 1599-1655. Een Hollands edelman tussen Nassau en Oranje (in Dutch). Vianen: Historische Vereniging Het Land van Brederode/Zutphen: Uitgeversmaatschappij Walburg Pers. p. 133–135. .
 
 
 
 
 
 
 
 ;  (1999). "Johan Wolfert van Brederode 1599–1655 – ʻIn Opbloey neergetoghenʼ". In:  e.a. (red.), Johan Wolfert van Brederode 1599–1655. Een Hollands edelman tussen Nassau en Oranje (in Dutch). Vianen: Historische Vereniging Het Land van Brederode/Zutphen: Uitgeversmaatschappij Walburg Pers. p. 9–46. .
 
 
 
 
 
 
 
 
 
  (1994). "Die nassauischen Begräbnisstätten in der ev. Stadtkirche zu Dillenburg". In:  (Hg.), 650 Jahre Stadt Dillenburg. Ein Text- und Bildband zum Stadtrechtsjubiläum der Oranierstadt (in German). Dillenburg: Verlag E. Weidenbach GmbH + Co. KG. p. 119–125.
  (2004). "Die Fürstengruft zu Siegen und die darin von 1669 bis 1781 erfolgten Beisetzungen". In:  u.a. (Redaktion), Siegener Beiträge. Jahrbuch für regionale Geschichte (in German). Vol. 9. Siegen: Geschichtswerkstatt Siegen – Arbeitskreis für Regionalgeschichte e.V. p. 183–202.
 
 
  (1994). "Beisetzungen in den 15 Grabstellen der Dillenburger Nassauergruft". In:  (Hg.), 650 Jahre Stadt Dillenburg. Ein Text- und Bildband zum Stadtrechtsjubiläum der Oranierstadt (in German). Dillenburg: Verlag E. Weidenbach GmbH + Co. KG. p. 115–118.
 
  (1937). "Brederode, Joan Wolfert van". In:  en  (redactie), Nieuw Nederlandsch Biografisch Woordenboek (in Dutch). Vol. Tiende deel. Leiden: A.W. Sijthoff. p. 125–126.
  (1979). "Genealogische gegevens". In:  (red.), Nassau en Oranje in de Nederlandse geschiedenis (in Dutch). Alphen aan den Rijn: A.W. Sijthoff. p. 40–44, 224–228. .
 
 
  (1882). Het vorstenhuis Oranje-Nassau. Van de vroegste tijden tot heden (in Dutch). Leiden: A.W. Sijthoff/Utrecht: J.L. Beijers.
  (redactie) (2000). Maurits prins van Oranje (in Dutch). Amsterdam: Rijksmuseum/Zwolle: Uitgeverij Waanders b.v. .

External links

 Johann VII. der Mittlere von Nassau-Siegen (in German). In: ZEIT.RAUM Siegen (in German).
 Nassau. In: Medieval Lands. A prosopography of medieval European noble and royal families, compiled by Charles Cawley.
 Nassau Part 5. In: An Online Gotha, by Paul Theroff.
 Nassau-Siegen, Johann VII. Graf von (in German). In: Landesgeschichtliches Informationssystem Hessen (LAGIS) (in German).
 The Wetterau Association of Counts (Wittgenstein, Nassau-Dillenburg-Siegen, Wied).

|-

1561 births
1623 deaths
John 07, Count of Nassau-Siegen
German Calvinist and Reformed Christians
German generals
German people of the Eighty Years' War
German people of the Thirty Years' War
John 07, Count of Nassau-Siegen
Military personnel of the Eighty Years' War
Military personnel of the Thirty Years' War
Military theorists
Military personnel from Siegen
Swedish military leaders
16th-century German people
17th-century German people